The Berlaymont is an office building in Brussels, Belgium, which houses the headquarters of the European Commission, the executive branch of the European Union (EU). The structure is located on the Robert Schuman Roundabout at 200, rue de la Loi/Wetstraat, in what is known as the "European Quarter". The unique form of the Berlaymont's architecture is used in the European Commission's official emblem.

Usage
The building has housed the European Commission since its construction, and has become a symbol of the European presence in Brussels and a metonym for the EU's executive power. The Commission itself is spread over some 60-odd buildings, but the Berlaymont is the commission's headquarters, being the seat of the President of the European Commission and its College of Commissioners.

The following Directorates-General (departments) are also based in the Berlaymont: Human Resources and Security (HR), European Political Strategy Centre, formerly known as Bureau of European Policy Advisers (BEPA), Communication (COMM), Brussels Office of Infrastructure and Logistics (OIB), Secretariat-General (SG) and the Legal Service (SJ).

The office of the president, the commission, and the boardroom, are on the 13th floor, together with the meeting room of the "Hebdo", as well as the restaurant La Convivialité.

Ursula von der Leyen is the first Commission's president to actually reside in the Berlaymont. She sleeps in a small private area next to her main office on the 13th floor.

History

Background

With the number of European civil servants rapidly growing since their arrival in Brussels in 1958, the European Commission required more and more office space across the city. By 1965, the Commission alone had 3,200 staff scattered across 8 different cramped buildings. The situation, which started as soon as they arrived due to the lack of large office blocks, became critical and the Commission tried to concentrate its staff in a number of rented buildings around the Robert Schuman Roundabout. The Belgian government, becoming aware of the problem and keen to ensure that the Commission stayed, offered to build a prestigious administration complex large enough to house the entire staff. President Walter Hallstein was interested but cautious about making long-term commitments while the issue of where the institutions were based was still being discussed. However, the need for office space was overwhelming.

The Belgian government's proposal required sufficient land which would preferably be in the Leopold Quarter (where they were already based) and near the homes of the civil servants to the south and east. The land chosen was then occupied by the Dames de Berlaymont, a 300-year-old convent which managed a venerable girls' school. The convent and school moved to a larger and quieter site out of the city centre in Waterloo. Once the Belgian state finished their new school and built infrastructure to it, the Dames de Berlaymont handed the site, which they had been under pressure to sell to developers for years, to the Belgian government in November 1963.

To organise what was needed, the Belgian Foreign Minister Pierre Wigny suggested a "Commission consultative Berlaymont", where the commission, the Belgian Public Works Ministry, the contractors and the architects could draw up the plans. However, the Belgian state desired a building not just tailored to the commission, but something that could be used by its own civil servants were the commission to leave. This was also why they favoured a central office building rather than the project for the construction of a "European city" on the Etterbeek. Due to the plans not meeting their exact desires, the Commission gained a lower rent.

Construction
The work was planned so that as soon as each wing was complete, staff could move in while the rest of the building was still under construction. The north and east wings were to be completed first (estimated for August 1961 though that proved optimistic). The south would take longer given the need to demolish more buildings including the girls school, with the Dames du Berlaymont unable to vacate until 1963. The Belgian government, realising that budgetary constraints meant it could not meet any of the deadlines, resorted to outside funding from the Office de sécurité sociale d'Outre-mer (OSSOM). OSSOM would own the land but the building would be constructed and rented by the Belgian government with rent deducted from its contribution to OSSOM's budget. Eventually it would buy it in 1985 through regular instalments while it was being sublet to the commission. OSSOM awarded the construction contract to an association of entrepreneurs: Enterprises François et Fils with Compagnie belge des Chemins de fer et d'entreprises, Compagnie industrielle de travaux and Armand Blaton. The lack of a public tender was criticised by the Belgian audit office.

In 1963, the first wing (north-east) entered its active phase and was scheduled to be finished by the end of 1965. Concreting on that wing was finished in November 1964. Completion was pushed back from the start of 1966 by a year due to the rail companies failing to vault the nearby railway line that prevented access to the ground floor. The wing was completed on 1 February 1967, with the first civil servants moving in three months later. The three-month gap was due to disagreements about the conditions of the lease. The Belgian state was to lease the whole building to the Commission starting from when the work was finished, but the other member states found the cost excessive and wanted to explore other options, gaining a lease for the one and only completed wing instead. The lease came into effect on 1 May 1967 and cost €545,366 (the whole building would be €4.82 million, a reduction of €2.48 million taking into account construction costs). The building was only fully occupied at the beginning of September of that year.

Expansion
However, from the start of the project, it was clear that the commission would expand beyond the capacity of the Berlaymont. The Charlemagne building became available for the commission. Furthermore, there was a building on Rue Archimède, this would allow the commission to concentrate itself in these buildings around the Schuman Roundabout and vacate the outer office complex. The cost of this deterred the council from approving the plan, seeing the rent being driven too high.

The commission also wanted to occupy the whole of the Berlaymont, which it shared with the Council and Parliament. The public most associated the commission with the building and it was seen as a matter of pride that they occupy the entire building. Doing so would give them more room and if they occupied that with the Joyeuse Entrée building which it had before, they would have enough space and the Charlemagne building could be occupied entirely by the council. This would mean they could communicate well but not have to work in the same building. The Council eventually agreed but moved into a different building on the roundabout.

Renovation

Renovation of the building became the responsibility of the Belgian state when it bought the Berlaymont from OSSOM in 1985, but put off any work due to budgetary constraints. The Commission complained and Belgium offered to sell the building to them at a reduced rate (the rent was already half) but as the political question of a permanent seat had not been decided the commission was not in a position to buy. Renovation suddenly became an important issue when flaked asbestos was found in the building in 1990. The civil servants' trade unions put on the pressure and the issue was used as a pretext for a full renovation as the facilities had become outdated and were not able to cope with the influx of new member states.

Demolition was not an option as the foundations anchored the local road and metro networks, which would be put in danger if the Berlaymont were to be destroyed. However it was hard to establish a full renovation budget due to budgetary constraints of the Belgian government. Hence, it was decided to bring in private sector financial institutions in the form of a management and renovation company: SA Berlaymont 2000 (in which the Belgian state remained a major shareholder). Berlaymont 2000 would pay €74.3 million to the Belgian state (also acting as a guarantor) and provide €160 million for the work, and in exchange it would gain a long lease on the building. Seeing it as a profitable investment, the following companies joined Berlaymont 2000: Citilease (affiliate of Citybank), CGER and BACOB. They began to provide finance and the commission's rent went up considerably to cover costs. The project was scheduled to start in 1994 and to take five years.

At the end of 1991, the Commissioners and their cabinets moved to the rapidly completed Breydel building and other departments moved out to buildings across the quarter and the wider capital: Auderghem, Evere and Etterbeek: in total, 11 buildings costing €14.8 million a year to the Belgian state in return the Commission kept paying the Berlaymont rent while it was vacated. However, the project began to face setbacks which tarnished Belgium's image as it failed to decide working arrangements which put back preliminary studies until Berlaymont 2000 took over in 1996 and set up a team to carry out the necessary studies. The Commission then stalled, doubting that the proposed plans would sufficiently adapt the Berlaymont to its new needs. Eventually, the plans were adapted enough for the Commission not only to accept them and return to the Berlaymont but to pay the renovation costs, signing a long lease in 1997 with an option to purchase.

Work on removing the asbestos began in the summer of 1995, three and a half years after the building was vacated. Work was expected to finish in February 1997, but inefficient organisation led to delay after delay: rumours about air pollution and violation of standards, electricity failures and asbestos outside the screen brought work to a halt. Longer time frames and more capital were demanded to complete the work. Outside management was brought in with asbestos removal being completed in 1999. Renovation work started on 1 June 1999 with work on full modernisation of the building, including better natural light flows, and construction was expected to be finished by the end of 2001 according to optimistic forecasts. However once more there were further delays from the subcontractors, Berlaymont 2000 and SNCB who were constructing a railway link below the building. Completion date was pushed back each year until it reached mid-2004.

Despite further considerable delays and legal battles, the building was handed over to the Commission in stages, starting from 1 July 2004 with civil servants moving back just before the start of the Barroso Commission, with their related cabinets and a total of 2,700 civil servants. In total, renovation took 13 years, five years longer than it took to build. The December 1998 handover date was delayed five times and the bill to the Belgian state for the poor planning and disagreements amounted, by some estimates, to €824 million.

Fire
On 18 May 2009 at approximately 1100 GMT the Berlaymont building was evacuated following a fire, which started in the press room. There were no reported casualties. The building does not have a fire sprinkler system except in the garage.

Architecture

The building, under the provisional name "Centre Administratif Europe", was designed by Lucien De Vestel, in association with Jean Gilson (Groupe Alpha), André and Jean Polak and with the recommendations of the engineer Joris Schmidt. It was directly inspired by the 1958 secretariat building of UNESCO in Paris (which was designed by Marcel Breuer, Pier Luigi Nervi and Bernard Zehrfuss). The technical design was ground-breaking at the time and generated an enthusiastic response from a Brussels journal: "This design concept reflects both the 20th century innovative spirit and sheer audacity and brings to mind the astonishing civil engineering arrow at the 1958 exhibition."

The building has a cruciform design with four wings of unequal size spanning from a central core. It was built on piles located beneath each wing, supporting a 40-metre high narrow ridge of concrete which in turn supported steel beams forming the frame of the glass façade covering the prefabricated floors. The top, 13th, floor however was supported directly by the upper beams, suspended entirely by them making the lower level free standing except for the core. The design is intended to convey a feeling of light and transparency. It includes decorative details such as sculptures and frescos to prevent it from becoming monotonous.

The complex was initially designed to house 3000 civil servants and 1600 cars in a four-level underground car park under the whole complex. Foundations run to 20 metres deep. The number of lower levels (which link to the road tunnels and metro) was due to the 55-metre height restriction around the Cinquantenaire (so as not to spoil the view) It included 17 flexible conference rooms which could be used by the European Parliament and Council of Ministers. There were a further nine Commission meeting rooms on the upper floors. Free space outside was converted into public gardens and terraces.

Since renovation, the structure has not changed except for a press extension, but there have been a number of internal and landscape changes. Traffic flow has been improved, but underground parking has been reduced by 25% and surface parking has been almost entirely converted into a pedestrian mall which flows into the surrounding urban landscape. Security has been improved, and a lighting well provides natural light to the restaurant and multimedia centres. The helipad was replaced by a cupola which houses the commission's meeting room, looking out over the Schuman Roundabout. The building meets the strictest environmental standards, reusing light, power and heat throughout the building.

The façade was replaced with a curtain wall with mobile glass screens that adapt to weather conditions and reduce glare while still allowing light in. They also act as a sound barrier, reducing noise from the rue de la Loi. The windows cut off the air conditioning when opened to prevent energy being wasted. Offices, which are now larger, can have their heating adjusted automatically or individually. The heating is turned off automatically when the room is unoccupied.

The building now has 240,000 m2 of floor space on 18 levels, connected by 42 lifts and 12 escalators. Offices for 3,000 officials and meeting rooms are in the tower. Restaurant and services, a 900-seat cafeteria, TV studio, conference rooms, storage rooms, Nordic sauna, car parking for over 1,100 vehicles and various services occupy the basement. Architects Pierre Lallemand, Steven Beckers and Wilfried Van Campenhout carried out the 1991–2004 renovation.

See also 
 Breydel building
 Convent Van Maerlant
 Madou Plaza Tower
 Brussels and the European Union
 Institutional seats of the European Union

References

Citations

Sources

External links

Buildings and structures in Brussels
European Commission
Buildings and structures of the European Union
European quarter of Brussels
Office buildings completed in 1969